Owen Wynne (1723 – 18 March 1789) was an Irish Member of Parliament. He sat in the House of Commons of Ireland from 1749 to 1789.

He was an MP for Sligo County from 1749 to 1778, and for Sligo Borough from 1776 until 1789.

Wynne was a prominent landowner in Co. Leitrim and Co. Sligo.  His main residence was Hazelwood House, Co. Sligo.  However, he spent a good deal of time in Dublin due to his parliamentary responsibilities and had a house on Henrietta Street.  His great uncle Owen Wynne (1665–1737) was a prominent soldier and politician and had purchased the estates in Co. Sligo to add to the family's existing estates in Co. Leitrim.  He then built Hazelwood House.

Wynne married Anne Maxwell, the sister of the first Earl of Farnham, on 13th December 1754.  They had six sons and three daughters.  The senior Wynne line of Hazelwood House died out in 1910 with the death of Owen Wynne VI (1843–1910) with no male heirs.  However, the wider family continued to flourish through the descendants of Wynne's younger sons. These descendants include General Sir Arthur Singleton Wynne, Arthur Beavor Wynne, Archdeacon George Robert Wynne, Emily Wynne, Gladys Wynne, Canon Billy Wynne and Kathleen Lynn.

References
 

1723 births
1789 deaths
Members of the Parliament of Ireland (pre-1801) for County Sligo constituencies
Irish MPs 1727–1760
Irish MPs 1761–1768
Irish MPs 1769–1776
Irish MPs 1776–1783
Irish MPs 1783–1790